The Saola Working Group SWG is a working group of the IUCN Species Survival Commission's Asian Wild Cattle Specialist Group, created in 2006 to protect the saolas (Pseudoryx nghetinhensis) and their habitat. The Conservancy works to engage and incorporate local communities in protecting saolas in Annamite Range mountains on the border of Laos and Vietnam.
The Saola is one of the most endangered species in the world. Discovered in 1992 it was the first large mammal new to science in more than 50 years and has never been seen by a biologist in the wild.
The Saola Working Group is a coalition that includes about 40 experts from the forestry departments of Laos and Vietnam, Vietnam's Institute of Ecology and Biological Resources, Vinh University, biologists and conservationists from Wildlife Conservation Society and the World Wildlife Fund.

Programs
The Saola Working Group works with local Laotian communities to educate the importance of the Saola. Villagers are hired to remove hunting snares that are among the biggest threats to the animal. Camera traps to document range and population of Saola are another primary focus.
New research published showing that leeches can store DNA from their meals for several months has led the SWG to sample leeches in the Annamite Range in hopes to find saola DNA.

William Robichaud representing the Saola Working Group is a regular featured guest speaker at the annual Wildlife Conservation Network Expo.

See also

 Wildlife Conservation Network
 Conservation movement
 Environmental movement
 Natural environment
 Sustainability

References

External links

 

Wildlife conservation organizations
Mammal conservation
Conservation projects
Organizations established in 2006
International environmental organizations
Organizations based in Laos
Environmental organizations based in Vietnam
Endangered species
2006 establishments in Asia